Dion Vlak (born 28 June 2001) is a Dutch professional footballer who plays for Spakenburg, as a goalkeeper.

References

2001 births
Living people
Dutch footballers
FC Volendam players
SV Spakenburg players
Tweede Divisie players
Eerste Divisie players
Association football goalkeepers